Rubus glandicaulis is a North American species of flowering plant in the rose family. It is native to eastern and central Canada (Québec, Ontario, and the 3 Maritime Provinces) and the northeastern and north-central United States (Wisconsin, Michigan, New York, Massachusetts, Vermont, New Hampshire, Maine).

Rubus glandicaulis is an erect shrub with perennial roots and hairy and prickly biennial shoots up to 6 feet (180 cm) tall. Leaves have 3 or 5 leaflets.

The genetics of Rubus is extremely complex, so that it is difficult to decide on which groups should be recognized as species. There are many rare species with limited ranges such as this. Further study is suggested to clarify the taxonomy.

References

External links
 

glandicaulis
Plants described in 1906
Flora of North America